The 2007 Brands Hatch Superbike World Championship round was the tenth round of the 2007 Superbike World Championship. It took place on the weekend of 3–5 August 2007, at Brands Hatch.

Superbike race 1 classification

Superbike race 2 classification

Supersport race classification

References 
 Superbike Race 1
 Superbike Race 2
 Supersport Race

Brands Hatch Round
Brands Hatch